Downe House School is a selective independent girls' boarding and day school in Cold Ash, a village near Newbury, Berkshire, for girls aged 11–18.

The Good Schools Guide described Downe House as an "Archetypal traditional girls' full boarding school turning out delightful, principled, courteous and able girls who go on to make a significant contribution to the world".

History
Downe House was founded in 1907 by Olive Willis, its first headmistress, as an all-girls' boarding school. Its first home was Down House in the village of Downe, Kent (now part of the London Borough of Bromley), which had been the home of Charles Darwin.

By 1921 Down House was too small for the school, so Willis bought The Cloisters, Cold Ash, Berkshire, from the religious order known as the Order of Silence. The school moved to the Cloisters in 1922, where it has since remained. It now accepts day pupils but is still predominantly a boarding school.

Downe House won Tatlers "Best Public School" award in 2011.

Houses
As most girls at Downe House are boarders, the house system is incorporated with the boarding programme. Three boarding houses home the youngest students, after which they progress to a mixed-age house until Sixth Form

The houses are:
Lower School (ages 11–13)
Hill
Hermitage
Darwin
Upper School (ages 13–16)
AGN (Ancren Gate North)
AGS (Ancren Gate South)
Aisholt
Holcombe
Tedworth
Sixth Form (ages 16–18)
Willis
York

Students in the Lower Fourth year spend a term boarding at Downe House's campus at Sauveterre near Toulouse, France.

Admissions
Downe House educates girls between the ages of eleven and eighteen, taking them from the last years of junior school through to the sixth form. Girls can join the school at the ages of eleven, twelve, or thirteen, on leaving a primary or prep school, or at sixteen after completing GCSEs. The biggest intake of girls is at 11+.

Entry into Downe House is competitive, with entrants needing to pass the Common Entrance Examination.

Curriculum
The core subjects at Downe House are English, Mathematics and Science as well as Humanities, Classics and Social Sciences subjects and there are options such as Fine Arts, Foreign Languages and Business Studies.

In 2010, the Cambridge Pre-U was introduced as an alternative to A Levels at Downe House.

2004 fees story

In 2004, as reported by The Times, Downe House was one of about sixty of the country's leading independent schools which were accused of running an unlawful price-fixing cartel, contrary to the Competition Act 1998, enabling them to drive up fees charged to thousands of parents. After an Inquiry later that year, in 2005 the school was ordered to pay a nominal penalty of £10,000, and with the other schools agreed to make ex-gratia payments totalling three million pounds into a trust to benefit pupils who attended the schools during the period in question. However, the Independent Schools Council said the investigation had been "a scandalous waste of public money". Jean Scott, its head, said that the schools had always been exempt from anti-cartel rules applied to business, were following a long-established procedure in sharing the information with each other, and had been unaware of a change to the law, on which they had not been consulted. She wrote to John Vickers, the Office of Fair Trading director-general, "They are not a group of businessmen meeting behind closed doors to fix the price of their products to the disadvantage of the consumer. They are schools that have quite openly continued to follow a long-established practice because they were unaware that the law had changed."

Notable former pupils 

 Margaret Aston, medieval historian
 Clare Balding, BBC sports presenter
 Elizabeth Bowen (1899–1973), novelist and short story writer
 Tessa Dahl, daughter of Roald Dahl and Patricia Neal
 Aileen Fox, archaeologist
 Miranda Hart, comedian and actress
 Marina Hyde, columnist for The Guardian
 Geraldine James, actress
 Catherine, Princess of Wales
 Mary Midgley, philosopher
 Rosemary Murray, first woman to hold office as Vice-Chancellor of the University of Cambridge
 Countess Alexandra Tolstoy, writer and presenter
 Edith Holt Whetham, agricultural historian and economist
 Annette Worsley-Taylor (1944–2015), fashion entrepreneur and the founder of London Fashion Week.

Notes

Bibliography

 (Describes life at Downe House during World War I)

 At openlibrary.org

External links

Profile on the ISC website

Private schools in West Berkshire District
Church of England private schools in the Diocese of Oxford
 
Member schools of the Girls' Schools Association
Educational institutions established in 1907
Boarding schools in Berkshire
1907 establishments in England
Girls boarding schools